Alien Dawn is a science fiction comedy television series which aired on Nicktoons. The series premiered on February 22, 2013 and supposedly ended on April 12, 2013, leaving 11 episodes unaired until TeenNick marathon aired the remaining episodes on July 27, 2014. The 11 remaining episodes were counted as a second season, even though production-wise the series was originally ordered as one season.

Plot
Alien Dawn follows the adventures of 16-year-old Cameron Turner as he races to uncover clues of a mysterious conspiracy hidden in the animated pages of a comic book series created by his missing father.

Cast and characters

Cast
 Aaron Sauter as Cameron Turner
 Kenny Sosnowska as Boris Walesa
 Alex Shimizu as Rock
 Andrew Lemonier as Roll
 Christina Caradon as Lucy Condon
 Clark Beasley Jr. as Hugh Condon
 Hilary Greer as Ruby Turner
 Michael For can as Brady Turner
 Nicola Wincing as Pierce Rockwell
 Zineb Lukach as Stella
 Devon Talbott as Norm
 Dutch Simmons as Chief Military Surgeon

Characters
Cameron Turner loves to skate board and hang out just like any other 16 year old skater. Cameron is slightly hostile toward his dad, because of him spending so much time in the basement working on the comics, but still misses him greatly. Cameron hates Hugh to the core and doesn't like him at all especially after starting to investigate his father's disappearance. Cameron cares deeply for Lucy though he doesn't like that she's changed so much and started hiding so much from him. It's also possible that Cameron is an alien. In the episode "The Compound, Pt.2," his eyes glow green, causing the alien that was attacking him to attack himself, and in the episode "The Trial," his eyes glow green again, but this time, he moves the device that was attacking Lucy with his mind. Although Cameron Turner is not an alien he had a chemical that was so close to are DNA implanted in him after he was born called olivine

Boris Walleyska is a slacker and loves to skate, he loves everything and anything science fiction he is a huge fan of Brady Turner but knows not to bring it up a lot around Cameron. He witnesses Cameron's eyes glow green in "The Trial," but he didn't say anything about it.

Lucy Condon keeps a lot to herself mostly about her father. But she is kind and never hesitates to help Cameron and Boris out of a sticky situation. She attended Orion Academy, but she doesn't remember anything until she returned to find out what happened Lucy learned that she was put into a space ship and entered space.

Pierce is the school bully. He claims that doesn't believe in aliens or anything extraterrestrial. He likes Lucy mostly because she is always around Cameron. Later in the show it's revealed that Pierce is robot working for Lucy's Father, Hugh Condon. He soon dies after deflecting an attack that was meant for Lucy. Pierce was later rebuilt. After Pierce finds out that he is a robot, he is able to use his powers at will.

Episodes

Airings
The pilot episode "Genesis" (a two-parter combining episodes 101 and 102) premiered on Nicktoons on February 22, 2013. Episodes 101 to 115 (fifteen episodes in the only season produced thus far) aired every Friday night two episodes at a time. Episode 115 aired on April 12, 2013. The show scheduling stopped without official word on when the last 11 episodes might air. It was stated that the show would return on May 15, then on June 1, and finally June 11. Alien Dawn did not run through the summer of 2013, not even re-airing the first 15 episodes. Up to today the show has not re-aired, nor has airing continued in US markets on the remaining 11 episodes. It was announced by Nick that they will not be continuing with the show and decided to cancel it. However, TeenNick announced that they will be re-airing Alien Dawn, as well as the 11 unaired episodes in a marathon as a part of their "Best Summer Ever" block; the episodes aired on July 27, 2014.

Season 1 (2013)

Season 2 (2014)
On July 27, 2014, TeenNick aired the 11 remaining episodes of Alien Dawn, counted as the second season of the series.

Production

Development
The series was originally going to be called Black Dawn. Filming began in January 2012 in New York City. It was touted as the first live-action series created for and by the American cable network Nicktoons. A total of 26 episodes were produced for the first season.

Lawsuit
On June 27, 2013, a suit was filed on behalf of the interns of Alien Dawn's live action crew against the Crook brothers and Larry Schwarz, as well as the companies associated with Larry Schwarz and His Band. Nicktoons was not mentioned in the suit. It alleges that Kevin Hicks was hired on as an unpaid intern working 10- to 16-hour days and was eventually hired on to perform the same duties for pay under a wardrobe assistant title, but that this pay ended and he was again asked to perform the same duties as an intern for no pay. It is alleged that the other interns on the production were performing duties that should have been performed for pay, in violation of the rules and laws governing interns. The lawsuit was settled by August 14, 2013.

References

Nicktoons (TV network) original programming
2010s American comic science fiction television series
2013 American television series debuts
2014 American television series endings
English-language television shows
Television series about teenagers
Television shows set in New York City
Television shows about comics
Television series by FremantleMedia Kids & Family